Marcella Daly (1901–1966) was an American film actress of the silent era.

Daly was the daughter of Mr. and Mrs. P. H. Daly and a graduate of the Whittier School and Hollywood High School.

In June 1924, Daly received publicity when casting director Lewis Mason committed suicide and left a note that said, in part, "Everything I have, please give to Marcella Daly."

Partial filmography

 Her Country First (1918)
 Trumpet Island (1920)
 The Star Rover (1920)
 West of Chicago (1922)
 The Folly of Vanity (1924)
 Dorothy Vernon of Haddon Hall (1924)
 The Great Jewel Robbery (1925)
 Defend Yourself (1925)
 The Movies (1925)
 Pursued (1925)
 The Prince of Pep (1925)
 Accused (1925)
 The Arizona Romeo (1925)
 Tearing Through (1925)
 Black Paradise (1926)
 The Non-Stop Flight (1926)
 Silk Stockings (1927)
 The Lone Eagle (1927)
 Married Alive (1927)
 The Arizona Wildcat (1927)
 The Midnight Watch (1927)
 Two Lovers (1928)

References

Bibliography
 Katchmer, George A. A Biographical Dictionary of Silent Film Western Actors and Actresses. McFarland, 2015.

External links

1901 births
1966 deaths
American film actresses
People from Kansas City, Missouri
20th-century American actresses
20th-century American people